The Last Prince  is a 2010 Philippine television drama romance fantasy series broadcast by GMA Network. Directed by Mac Alejandre, it stars Aljur Abrenica in the title role and Kris Bernal. It premiered on January 11, 2010 on the network's Telebabad line up replacing Sana Ngayong Pasko. The series concluded on June 25, 2010 with a total of 117 episodes. It was replaced by Endless Love in its timeslot.

Cast and characters

Lead cast
 Aljur Abrenica as Almiro
 Kris Bernal as Lara Fernandez

Supporting cast
 Bianca King as Bawana
 Eula Valdez as Adela
 Angelu de Leon as Mayang
 Carmina Villaroel as Lamara
 Emilio Garcia as Adorno
 Chanda Romero as Rosata
 Chynna Ortaleza as Lourdez
 Bubbles Paraiso as Saraya
 Paolo Ballesteros as Anexi
 Benjie Paras as Rizayo
 Elvis Gutierrez as Guwarko
 Joey Paras as Salim Salamin
 Francis Magundayao as Onuro
 Karen delos Reyes as Minnie
 Angeli Nicole Sanoy as Bambi
 Rita Iringan as Gigi

Guest cast
 Daniel Matsunaga as Prince Nikolai
 Carl Guevarra as Jerrick Santella
 Jay Manalo as Carlos Ledesma
 Jhoana Marie Tan as teen Bambi
 Mosang as Uruja
 Dang Cruz as Goray
 Jan Manual as Harold
 Maybelyn dela Cruz as Diwani Ogyna
 Jenny Miller as Dominique
 Stef Prescott as Naveya
 Patani as Bina
 Sherilyn Reyes-Tan as Cicit
 Jan Marini as Josie
 Gene Padilla as Sintoy
 Jillian Ward as Daldanika
 Jace Flores as a town bully
 Kiel Rodriguez as a town bully
 Dex Quindoza as a town bully
 Princess Punzalan as Alwana
 Geoff Eigenmann as Javino Perez
 Carla Abellana as Sonia

Ratings
According to AGB Nielsen Philippines' Mega Manila household television ratings, the pilot episode of The Last Prince earned a 30.9% rating.

References

External links

2010 Philippine television series debuts
2010 Philippine television series endings
Fantaserye and telefantasya
Filipino-language television shows
GMA Network drama series
Philippine romance television series